Rożnów  is a village in the administrative district of Gmina Wołczyn, within Kluczbork County, Opole Voivodeship, in southwestern Poland.

There is an interesting pyramid-shaped tomb here, built in 1780 during the German-Prussian era when the village was called Ober-Rosen. It was designed by Carl Gotthard Langhans (who also designed the Brandenburg Gate) and housed the tombs of Prussian general  Karl Adolf August von Eben und Brunnen and his closest relatives. The graves were desecrated by Soviet troops in 1945.

References

Villages in Kluczbork County